The Guatemala women's national football team is controlled by the Federación Nacional de Fútbol de Guatemala.
They are one of the top women's national football teams in the Central American region along with Costa Rica, having won the 1999 UNCAF championship.

History
Following the creation of the first national women's league in 1997, a Guatemala women's national team was formed and in 1998 it began playing official international matches, the first of which was an 11–0 win against Honduras on 19 July 1998. After two more wins against El Salvador and Haiti, Guatemala advanced to the final qualification tournament to the 1999 Women's World Cup, where they finished fourth.

In June 1999 the first UNCAF Women's Championship was celebrated in Guatemala City, where after wins against Honduras and Nicaragua and a draw against Costa Rica, the host team won the title by beating the latter 2–0 in the final, in front of 12,000 spectators at the Estadio Mateo Flores. Guatemala captain Magnolia Pérez was the top scorer and best player of the tournament. Guatemala was invited to the 2000 Women's Gold Cup, where they lost all three first round matches against China, Mexico, and Canada.

At the 2001 Central American Games in home soil, Guatemala won their first round group but was then eliminated on penalty kicks in a semi final against Honduras, after which Guatemala beat El Salvador for the bronze medal.

Guatemala entered qualification to the 2004 Olympic Games, where they earned a place in the final qualification tournament after beating Belize and drawing against Panama in the first round in November 2003, but its participation in the competition was halted and the team was replaced by Panama, as FIFA banned Guatemala from all international competitions in January 2004 until February 2004. Between 2004 and 2010, the Guatemala women's team's participation in international competitions was very scarce, with only two competitive matches played, both in 2006 during qualification to the 2006 Women's Gold Cup.

In 2010 Guatemala won the bronze medal at the 2010 Central American and Caribbean Games in Mayagüez, Puerto Rico, with a 2 wins, 1 draw, and 2 losses record. Later that year, Guatemala participated at the IV Women's Gold Cup, losing all three of their first round matches, against Costa Rica, the United States, and Haiti.

Guatemala hosted the 2012 Central American Pre-Olympic tournament, where they narrowly advanced to the final stage, finishing second behind Costa Rica after beating El Salvador 2–1. At the final qualification tournament in Vancouver, Guatemala lost to Mexico and the United States and beat the Dominican Republic, finishing third in their group and eliminated from the 2012 Olympic Tournament.

Results and fixtures

The following is a list of match results in the last 12 months, as well as any future matches that have been scheduled.

Legend

2022

Guatemala Results and Fixtures – Soccerway.com
Guatemala Results and Fixtures – FIFA.com

Players

Current squad
The following 20 players were called up for the matches against the United States Virgin Islands and Curaçao on 16 and 19 February 2022, respectively.

Recent call-ups

Competitive record

FIFA Women's World Cup

*Draws include knockout matches decided on penalty kicks.

Olympic Games

*Draws include knockout matches decided on penalty kicks.

CONCACAF Women's Championship

*Draws include knockout matches decided on penalty kicks.

Pan American Games

*Draws include knockout matches decided on penalty kicks.

Central American and Caribbean Games

*Draws include knockout matches decided on penalty kicks.

Central American Games

*Draws include knockout matches decided on penalty kicks.

See also
Sport in Guatemala
Football in Guatemala
Women's football in Guatemala
Guatemala men's national football team

References

External links
Official website
FIFA profile

 
Central American women's national association football teams